Víctor Hugo Antelo Bárba (born 2 November 1964) is a Bolivian football manager and former player who played as a striker.

Antelo the all-time topscorer in the Bolivian League with 350 goals scored in 18 seasons. In 2000, he was named the world's active most prolific top division goalscorer with 343 goals in 429 league games.

Club career
Nicknamed Tucho, Santa Cruz de la Sierra-born Antelo began playing for amateur club Universidad. In 1983, he jumped to professional football when he signed for Oriente Petrolero at age 18. During his professional career he also played for Blooming, Real Santa Cruz, Bolivar, The Strongest, and San José. Although he spent most of his career in Bolivia, he made a short spell in Japanese football with Fujita Kogyo in 1990.

Among his achievements, he has won the title of topscorer in the Liga de Fútbol Profesional Boliviano 7 times. Between May 17 and September 6 of 1998, he scored 18 goals in 12 consecutive matches, and therefore broke the record of most consecutive games finding the net, previously set by Juan Carlos Sánchez, who coincidentally comes second behind Antelo in the list of all time topscorers. In addition, he has scored a total of 21 goals in 46 Copa Libertadores games.

International career
Despite proving his natural talent as a topscorer, Antelo was rarely considered by Bolivia national team managers throughout his career and was overlooked for the 1994 FIFA World Cup. He only earned 11 caps for Bolivia netting 2 goals.

Managerial career
After retiring as a player in 2000, "Tucho" pursued a coaching career. The following year, he took over Oriente Petrolero and had a successful season. As result, the club obtained its third national championship, the first in eleven years. Later, Antelo managed other first division clubs; among them, Blooming, The Strongest, Bolivar, Guabirá,  Destroyers, Aurora and most recently Sport Boys Warnes; however, he wasn't able to match the success once achieved with Oriente.

Honours

Player
Bolívar
 Liga de Fútbol Profesional Boliviano: 1992, 1994
Blooming
 Liga de Fútbol Profesional Boliviano: 1998, 1999

Manager
Oriente Petrolero
 Liga de Fútbol Profesional Boliviano: 2001

Individual
 Liga de Fútbol Profesional Boliviano Top scorer: 1984 (38 goals), 1985 (37 goals), 1989 (22 goals), 1993 (20 goals), 1997 (24 goals), 1998 (31 goals), 1999 (31 goals)

References

External links
 

1964 births
Living people
Sportspeople from Santa Cruz de la Sierra
Association football forwards
Bolivian footballers
Bolivia international footballers
Bolivian Primera División players
Oriente Petrolero players
Club Blooming players
Shonan Bellmare players
Club Bolívar players
Club San José players
The Strongest players
Bolivian expatriate footballers
Expatriate footballers in Japan
Bolivian expatriate sportspeople in Japan
Japan Soccer League players
Bolivian football managers
Oriente Petrolero managers
Club Blooming managers
The Strongest managers
Club Destroyers managers
Club Bolívar managers
Club Deportivo Guabirá managers
Club Aurora managers
1987 Copa América players
1999 Copa América players
Sport Boys Warnes managers